Isaac Parker (1838–1896), U.S. District Court judge.

Isaac Parker may also refer to:

 Isaac Parker (Massachusetts judge) (1768–1830), U.S. Representative from Massachusetts
 Isaac T. Parker (1849–1911), American politician, the second Lieutenant Governor of Delaware
 Isaac Parker (Texas politician) (1793–1883), Republic of Texas and state Senator, for Twenty-first Texas Legislature
 Isaac Charles Parker (1838–1896), American politician and jurist